Birds of Passage is a 2018 epic crime film directed by Ciro Guerra and Cristina Gallego.

The film explores the rise of a Wayuu man and his family as they enter the drug trade, prosper, and slowly lose their traditions and former way of life.

It was selected to open the 50th edition of the Directors' Fortnight section at the 2018 Cannes Film Festival. It was selected as the Colombian entry for the Best Foreign Language Film at the 91st Academy Awards, making the December shortlist.

Plot
In the late 1960s, Zaida (Natalia Reyes), a young Wayuu woman, comes of age. She meets Rapayet (José Acosta) who proposes to marry her. Zaida comes from the influential Pushaina family and her mother, Ursula, sets her dowry high.

Rapayet comes across white American Peace Corps volunteers desperate for marijuana. Rapayet and his friend Moisés go to Rapayet's cousin, Gabriel, who grows marijuana. Impressed by their product, one of the Americans offers Rapayet a business deal exporting the drugs. With the money from the trade Rapayet is able to pay Zaida's dowry in full, though Ursula disapproves of his dealings with foreigners.

A few years later, Rapayet is happily married to Zaida, with the export business having grown into a large-scale operation. Moisés urges Rapayet to expand the business and work with other growers, but Rapayet stays loyal to Gabriel. During a handoff, Rapayet realizes the Americans he is working with are dealing with others. Moisés kills two of the men, only to be stopped from killing a third when Rapayet threatens him. The Pushaina family urges Rapayet to kill Moisés in retribution for the blood he has spilled. However, in deference to their friendship, Rapayet instead tells Moisés he is no longer welcome in the business. Moisés and his men kill Gabriel and his family in retaliation, and Rapayet is forced to kill Moisés. With the Pushaina family backing him, he strikes a new deal with Gabriel's brother, Anibal, but for a higher fee.

By the end of the 1970s, Rapayet and his family are enjoying a prosperous life and are invited to attend Gabriel's second burial. In spite of Ursula's reluctance, the entire family attends. Leonidas, Ursula's youngest son who has grown up knowing only extravagant wealth, drunkenly tries to seduce Anibal's daughter, and later forces one of her bodyguards to eat dog feces in exchange for money. As retribution, Anibal demands that Leonidas work in his fields. Although Ursula urges Rapayet not to comply, Zaida urges him to, hoping to avoid war. While staying in Anibal's compound, Leonidas rapes his daughter, triggering a feud between the clans.

Once again trying to avoid war, Rapayet sends a word messenger offering Anibal his entire business. Anibal kills the word messenger, signifying a total break with Wayuu tradition. Rapayet, Zaida and their children flee. The murder causes other Wayuu clans to send their word messengers to Ursula, who is shocked when most are willing to turn their backs on her family, believing they have lost their traditions and are no longer Wayuu. Ursula is forced to give up the sacred objects belonging to her family. Using the strength of the other families, Ursula kidnaps her daughter and grandchildren and warns Rapayet not to return.

Anibal's compound is destroyed and his men are killed. He uses the last of his money to hire mercenaries to decimate Rapayet's compound, leaving only Ursula and Zaida's daughter Indira alive. Ursula urges Indira to run away with Leonidas, but finding him drunk and nearly dead, she is forced to go on alone. Ursula gives up what remains of her business, and Rapayet's location, to Anibal, in exchange for her grandson's body. Anibal tracks down Rapayet and murders him, vowing to also kill Leonidas.

Cast
 Carmiña Martínez as Úrsula
 Natalia Reyes as Zaida
 José Acosta as Rapayet
 Jhon Narváez as Moisés
 Jose Vicente Cotes as Peregrino, Rapayet's uncle
 Juan Bautista as Aníbal
 Greider Meza as Leonidas

Production
Production for the film took ten years with writer-directors Cristina Gallego and Ciro Guerra becoming interested in the Wayuu people while filming The Wind Journeys which Guerra wrote and directed and Gallego produced. The filmmakers based the film on real stories they heard during this research phase and incorporated members of the community into their production. According to the directors about 30% of the cast and crew was made up of local Wayuu people.

The film marks the directorial debut of Gallego who had previously worked as a producer and decided to co-direct the film in order to add a female perspective as women are valued in Wayuu culture and were also a part of the drug trade in the 1970s.

In addition to their longtime producing and direction partnership Gallego and Guerra were also married. They divorced amicably during the production of the film.

Reception

Critical response
The website's critical consensus reads, "Birds of Passage traces the familiar arc of the drug crime thriller from a different direction that's as visually absorbing as it is hard-hitting." The film is one of the highest-rated ones of 2018. Metacritic assigned the film a weighted average score of 86 out of 100, based on 24 critics, indicating "universal acclaim".

Some critics have compared it favourably to other crime saga films like The Godfather, Scarface and the television series The Sopranos. Indiewire's Eric Kohn awarded the film a B+ rating, calling it "another fascinating tone poem about Colombia’s fractured identity". Jordan Hoffman of The Guardian gave a positive review of the film, writing "in the most reductive way, it is another mafia story. But as with their previous film (Embrace of the Serpent), it is the specificity that counts, and while certain genre tendencies prevent the narrative from truly unmooring, hardly a scene goes by without something fundamentally familiar being rendered in a unique fashion".

Varietys Peter Debruge wrote that "few films have captured quite so powerfully the tension between the old and new worlds — a feat “Birds of Passage” accomplishes while simultaneously allowing audiences to channel the Wayuu’s surrealistic view of their surroundings, where spirits walk the earth, and wise women interpret their dreams". Jessica Kiang of The Playlist stated the film was "wildly alive, yet it reminds us that no matter how modern we are, there are ancient songs our forebears knew whose melodies still rush in our blood". About the Wayuu people depicted here she wrote: "the Wayuu here are neither exploited innocents nor backward savages, but flawed humans indulging recognisable human instincts of greed and rapaciousness... You do not have to have Wayuu ancestry, or any connection to the region to understand the broader implications of this epic story of haunted druglords and ruthless power grabs that are partly predicated on traditional beliefs and shibboleths".

Former United States President Barack Obama named Birds of Passage among his favorite films and television series of 2019. In his annual list of favorite films, which he released on Twitter on December 29, 2019.

Box office 
The movie generated US $507,259 at the North American box office and $901,929 elsewhere for a worldwide total of $1,409,188, making it the most successful Spanish language Colombian film since the international festival sensation Embrace of the Serpent in 2016 by the same director.

Awards and nominations 

|-
| align = "center" | 2019 || 61st Ariel Awards || Best Ibero-American Film || Birds of Passage ||  || 
|}

See also
 List of submissions to the 91st Academy Awards for Best Foreign Language Film
 List of Colombian submissions for the Academy Award for Best Foreign Language Film

References

External links
 
 
 
 

2018 films
2018 crime films
Colombian crime films
Films directed by Ciro Guerra
2010s Spanish-language films
Wayuu-language films
2018 multilingual films
Colombian multilingual films